"Beloved Isle Cayman" is the official national song of the Cayman Islands, composed by Leila Ross-Shier in 1930. As a British Overseas Territory, the official national anthem is "God Save the King".

References

External links
Nationalanthems.info

Caymanian culture
North American anthems
1930 songs